

Club history

Beginnings Club 

The beginnings of Jaroměř football date from the year 1903, when in work English installers at the former textile company Bondy, present Race Miletus. They roamed free time on the ball then, frajáku "next to today's Barracks at the cemetery and from these installers began an interest Jaroměř Youth o football. played in different slices, different ball mostly with, hadráky "which have the advantage that the technical playing soccer. The greatest interest in this game was between laborers and students, however, they have more difficulties in that soccer, as well as other kinds of Sports was the then educational institutions banned and severely punished, including expulsion from school.

Bohemia Jaromer 

In the early days it played under the name Bohemia Jaromer, since 1906, then under SK Jaroměř and was played only friendly matches. In 1908, the SK enrolled in organized competitions, playing teams from Pardubice, Hradec Kralove, Náchod, Dvur Kralove and Chrudim. Championships were played only one round in the spring, the fall is then only played friendly matches. The course was a former military training ground near the cemetery, goals were built in every match and again carried away. Club room was in the former pub, U Matys', opposite the barracks, now demolished, and from there went on to the field.

World War I 

In the war years 1914–1918 to soccer played little because most of the players enlisted to Front.

Boom 

Boom Jaroměř football occurred in the years 1920 – 1930, when he began to build a playground in Rose Street in the Jakubské suburb, where he gradually built a wooden grandstand. It was in 1955 grandstand replaced brick, which is still in operation. Is enclosed the field, stood a barrier around the board and stand for refreshments. It was built i billiards and a playground for volleyball.
Social flotator in an old wooden grandstand was built in the year 1932. Until then, the players were washing in stream that ran behind the grandstand. In 1955 stood Tribune brick, covered grassy area, water supply for irrigation area, built a cinder pitch, sanitary facilities for spectators and the reconstruction of the electrical and plumbing inside tribuny. To everything was built with the assistance of many members and voluntary hours Competitors section.
The stadium in 2000 hit by floods.

Reds and stapling 

In 1928 the anniversary of 20 years of Football in Jaroměř played in SK Slavia Prague and AC Sparta Prague.

Division and back 

After Second World War Jaroměř had very good junior team that in 1947 fought their way to the Cup final of Bohemia. For this team, then a number of players went to Hradec Kralove, with whom he won the partition 1st League. Over the years he fought Jaroměř in the county 1A class. In 1962 became crowned the winner Cup East Region, but in the national competition was eliminated then Red Star Brno headed by a representative of Ivo Viktor. A year later he descended into Jaroměř 1.B class, and seven long years of struggling in vain to return. Only in 1970 advanced to the 1A class, he won, played in regional championship, which after two years of action won and advanced to Division C. There, however, after a good start, it ceased to flourish and after a one-year lagged effect of competition. Thus began again go back to class 1A, where the contest in 1988 won and advanced to the regional championship.

Sparta Jaroměři 

To celebrate the 11th former Internacional Sparta CKD Praha we have for this game invite a number of former players and officials and we can reminisce on the past years in football Jaroměř.

After 1989 

After 1989 Jaroměř played for decades in the class IA, but in the 1998–99 season descended into the district championship. For this competition, advances in 2001 to the IB class and the year 2007 / 2008 to the IA class. It's hard to believe, but in 2008 got into regional championship from 3rd place in this competition and lasted until 2015, ranked second and advanced after 41 years into Division C.

Football clubs in the Czech Republic
Association football clubs established in 1908
1908 establishments in Austria-Hungary